Thasra is one of the 182 Legislative Assembly constituencies of Gujarat state in India. It is part of Kheda district.

List of segments
This assembly seat represents the following segments,

 Thasra Taluka

Members of Legislative Assembly
2007 - Ramsinh Parmar, Indian National Congress
2012 - Ramsinh Parmar, Indian National Congress

Election results

2022

2017

2012

See also
 List of constituencies of the Gujarat Legislative Assembly
 Kheda district

References

External links
 

Assembly constituencies of Gujarat
Kheda district